Cryptotrema is a genus of labrisomid blennies native to the eastern Pacific Ocean.

Species
There are currently two recognized species in this genus:
 Cryptotrema corallinum C. H. Gilbert, 1890 (Deep-water blenny)
 Cryptotrema seftoni C. Hubbs, 1954 (Hidden blenny)

References

 
Labrisomidae